Mahasonkote Shonku (Shonku in Deep Peril) is a Professor Shonku series book written by Satyajit Ray and published by Ananda Publishers in 1977. Ray wrote the stories about Professor Shanku for Bengali magazines Sandesh and Anandamela. This book is a collection of three Shonku stories.

Stories
 Shonku'r Shanir Dasha (Anandamela, Autumn 1976),
 Shonku'r Subarna Sujog (Sandesh, April, May and June 1977),
 Hypnogen (Sandesh, April, May and June 1976)

See also
Shabash Professor Shonku
Punashcha Professor Shonku
Professor Shonkur Kandokarkhana

References

Professor Shonku
1977 short story collections